The Getaway is a 1972 American heist thriller film based on the 1958 novel by Jim Thompson. The film was directed by Sam Peckinpah, written by Walter Hill, and stars Steve McQueen, Ali MacGraw, Ben Johnson, Al Lettieri, and Sally Struthers. The plot follows imprisoned mastermind robber Carter "Doc" McCoy (McQueen), whose wife Carol (MacGraw) conspires for his release on the condition they rob a bank in Texas. A double-cross follows the crime and the McCoys are forced to flee for Mexico with the police and criminals in hot pursuit.

Peter Bogdanovich, whose The Last Picture Show impressed McQueen and producer David Foster, was originally hired as the director of The Getaway. Thompson came on board to write the screenplay, but creative differences ensued between him and McQueen and he was subsequently fired along with Bogdanovich. Writing and directing duties eventually went to Hill and Peckinpah, respectively. Principal photography commenced on February 7, 1972, on location in Texas. The film reunited McQueen and Peckinpah, both of whom had previously worked together on the relatively unprofitable Junior Bonner which was released the same year.

The Getaway premiered on December 13, 1972. Despite the negative reviews it received upon release, numerous retrospective critics gave the film good reviews. A box office hit earning over $36 million, it was the eighth highest-grossing film of 1972, and was one of the most financially successful productions of Peckinpah's and McQueen's careers. A film remake of the same name starring Alec Baldwin and Kim Basinger was released in 1994.

Plot
Four years into his ten-year sentence for armed robbery, Carter "Doc" McCoy is denied parole from a Texas prison. When his wife Carol visits him, he tells her to do whatever is necessary to make a deal with Jack Beynon, a corrupt businessman in San Antonio, to free him. Beynon uses his influence and obtains Doc's parole on the condition that he plan and take part in a bank robbery with two of his henchmen, Rudy Butler and Frank Jackson. The robbery initially goes as planned, until Frank kills a security guard. Rudy then attempts a double-cross, shooting Frank in the groin as they drive away and kicking him out of their moving car, killing him. At their designated meeting place, Rudy tries to draw on Doc, but Doc anticipates Rudy's double-cross and shoots Rudy several times. Doc and Carol take the $500,000 (equivalent to $ million in ) and leave. Rudy, having secretly worn a bulletproof vest, is only wounded.

Doc meets with Beynon, not realizing he had arranged a double-cross wherein Carol would sneak into the meet and kill Doc; however, Carol turns her gun on Beynon and shoots him dead. Doc, having just been taunted by Beynon before Carol shot him, realizes that Carol had sex with Beynon to secure his parole. He angrily gathers up the money and, after a bitter quarrel, the couple flees for the border at El Paso.

Rudy forces rural veterinarian Harold Clinton and his wife Fran to treat his injuries, then kidnaps the pair to pursue Doc and Carol. Beynon's brother Cully and his team also track the McCoys down. At a train station, a con man swaps locker keys with Carol and steals their bag of money. Doc follows him onto a train and forcibly takes it back, although the con man has already pocketed a packet of the money. The injured con man and a train passenger—a boy whom Doc had rebuked for squirting him with a water gun—are taken to the police station, where they identify Doc's mug shot.

Carol buys a car, and the McCoys drive to an electronics store. As Doc buys a portable radio, he switches off the radio set near the proprietor's desk broadcasting the news of the earlier incidents they were involved in. When all the television sets in the store show Doc's picture, he leaves immediately. The proprietor gets a glimpse of the picture and calls the police. Doc steals a shotgun from a neighboring store, and shoots up the police car so that they can flee.

The mutual attraction between Rudy and Fran, the veterinarian's wife, leads to them having consensual sex on two occasions in front of her husband, who is tied up in a chair. Humiliated, the vet hangs himself in the motel bathroom. Rudy and Fran move on, barely acknowledging the suicide. They check into an El Paso hotel used by criminals as a safe house because Rudy knows that the McCoys will be heading to the same place. When Doc and Carol check in at the hotel, they ask for food to be delivered, but the manager, Laughlin, says he is working alone and cannot leave the desk. Doc realizes that Laughlin sent his family away because something is about to happen. He urges Carol to dress quickly so they can escape. An armed Rudy comes to their door while Fran poses as a delivery girl. Peering from an adjacent doorway, Doc is surprised to see Rudy alive. He sneaks up behind Rudy, knocks him out, and does the same to Fran.

Beynon's brother and his thugs arrive as the McCoys try to leave. A violent gunfight ensues in the halls, stairwell, and elevator and all but one of Cully's men are killed; Doc allows him to run away. Rudy comes to, follows Doc and Carol outside onto a fire escape, and shoots at them. Doc returns fire and kills him. With the police on the way, the couple hijack a pickup truck and force the driver, a cooperative old cowboy, to take them to Mexico. After crossing the border, Doc and Carol pay the cowboy $30,000 for his truck. Overjoyed, the cowboy heads back to El Paso on foot, while the couple continue into Mexico, having gotten away with their crimes, and the remainder of the money.

Cast

Production

Development

Steve McQueen had been encouraging his publicist David Foster to enter the film industry for years, as a producer. His first attempt was Butch Cassidy and the Sundance Kid (1969), with McQueen starring alongside Paul Newman, but 20th Century Fox, particularly its president, Richard D. Zanuck, did not want Foster as part of the deal. Rather, Zanuck hired producer Paul Monash since he was the studio's profit maker, resulting in McQueen's departure from the project, which then fell apart. While McQueen was making Le Mans (1971) Foster acquired the rights to Jim Thompson's crime novel The Getaway. Foster sent McQueen a copy of the book urging him to do it. The actor was looking for a "good/bad guy" role and saw these qualities in the novel's protagonist, Doc McCoy.

Foster looked for a director and Peter Bogdanovich came to his attention. Bogdanovich's agent, Jeff Berg, set up a special screening of his client's soon-to-be released The Last Picture Show (1971) for Foster with McQueen in attendance. They loved it and met with the director and a deal was reached. However, Warner Bros. approached Bogdanovich with an offer to direct What's Up, Doc? (1972), starring Barbra Streisand, with the stipulation that he had to start right away. The director wanted to do both, but the studio refused. When McQueen heard this, he became upset and told Bogdanovich that he was going to get someone else to direct The Getaway.

McQueen had recently worked with director Sam Peckinpah on Junior Bonner (1972) and enjoyed the experience, but the film proved to be unsuccessful. He said: "Out of all my movies, Junior Bonner did not make one cent. In fact, it lost money." McQueen recommended that Foster approach Peckinpah. Like McQueen, Peckinpah was in need of a box office hit and accepted immediately. The filmmaker had read the novel when it was originally published and had talked to Thompson about making a film adaptation when he was starting out as a director.

At the time, Peckinpah wanted to make Emperor of the North Pole (1973), a story set during the Great Depression about a brakeman obsessed with keeping homeless people off his train. The film's producer made a deal with Paramount Pictures' production chief Robert Evans, allowing Peckinpah to do his personal project if he first directed The Getaway. The director was soon dismissed from Emperor and told that Paramount was not making The Getaway.

A conflict arose with Paramount over the film's budget. Foster had thirty days to set up a new deal with another studio, or Paramount would own the exclusive rights. He was inundated with offers and accepted one from First Artists Productions, because McQueen would receive no upfront salary, just ten percent of the gross receipts from the first dollar taken in on the film. This would become very profitable if the film was a box office hit.

Writing
Jim Thompson was hired by Foster and McQueen to adapt his novel. He worked on the screenplay for four months, changing some of the scenes and episodes in his novel. Thompson's script included the borderline surrealistic ending from his novel featuring El Rey, an imaginary Mexican town filled with criminals. McQueen objected to the depressing ending and Thompson was replaced by screenwriter Walter Hill. Hill had been recommended by Polly Platt, Bogdanovich's wife, who was then still attached to direct; Platt had been impressed by Hill's work on Hickey & Boggs (1972). Hill said Bogdanovich wanted to turn the material into a more Hitchcock-type thriller, but he had only written the first twenty-five pages when McQueen fired the director. Hill finished the script in six weeks, then Peckinpah came on board.

Peckinpah read Hill's draft, and the screenwriter remembered that he made few changes: "We made it non-period and added a little more action." On Thompson's novel, Hill said:

Casting

When Bogdanovich was to direct, he intended to cast Cybill Shepherd, his then girlfriend, in the role of Carol. As soon as Peckinpah came on to direct, he wanted to cast Stella Stevens with whom he had worked on The Ballad of Cable Hogue (1970), with Angie Dickinson and Dyan Cannon as possible alternatives. Foster suggested Ali MacGraw, a much in-demand actress after the commercial success of Love Story (1970). She was married to Robert Evans, who wanted her to avoid being typecast in preppy roles, and set up a meeting for her with Foster, McQueen, and Peckinpah about the film. According to Foster, she was scared of McQueen and Peckinpah because they had reputations as "wild, two-fisted, beer guzzlers". McQueen and MacGraw experienced a strong instant attraction. "He was recently separated and free," she said, "and I was scared of my overwhelming attraction to him." MacGraw was paid $300,000 plus German distribution rights.

Peckinpah originally wanted actor Jack Palance to play the role of Rudy Butler but could not afford his salary. Impressed by his performance in The Panic in Needle Park (1971), Hill recommended Richard Bright. Bright had worked with McQueen fourteen years before, but he did not have the threatening physique that McQueen pictured for Butler because the two men were the same height. Due to his friendship with Bright, Peckinpah cast him as the con man. Al Lettieri was brought to Peckinpah's attention for the role of Butler by producer Albert S. Ruddy, who was working with the actor on The Godfather (1972). Like Peckinpah, Lettieri was a heavy drinker which caused problems while filming due to his unpredictable behavior.

Filming
Principal photography of The Getaway began in Huntsville, Texas, on February 7, 1972. Peckinpah shot the opening prison scenes at the Huntsville Penitentiary, with McQueen surrounded by actual convicts. Other shooting locations included Texas towns such as San Marcos, San Antonio  and El Paso.

McQueen and MacGraw began an affair during production. She would eventually leave her husband Evans and become McQueen's second wife. Foster was worried that their relationship could have a potentially negative impact on the film by causing a scandal. MacGraw got her start as a model, and her inexperience as an actress was evident on the set as she struggled with the role. According to Foster, the actress and Peckinpah got along well, but she was not happy with her performance: "After we had completed The Getaway and I looked at what I had done in it, I hated my own performance. I liked the picture, but I despised my own work."

Peckinpah's intake of alcohol increased dramatically while making The Getaway, and he was fond of saying, "I can't direct when I'm sober." He and McQueen got into occasional heated arguments during filming. The director recalled one such incident on the first day of rehearsal in San Marcos: "Steve and I had been discussing some point on which we disagreed, so he picked up this bottle of champagne and threw it at me. I saw it coming and ducked. And Steve just laughed." McQueen had a knack with props, especially the weapons he used in the film. Hill remembered, "You can see Steve's military training in his films. He was so brisk and confident in the way he handled the guns." It was McQueen's idea to have his character shoot and blow up a squad car in the scene where Doc holds two police officers at gunpoint.

Under his contract with First Artists, McQueen had final cut privileges on The Getaway. When Peckinpah found out, he was upset. Richard Bright said that McQueen chose takes that "made him look good" and Peckinpah felt that the actor had played it safe: "He chose all these Playboy shots of himself. He's playing it safe with these pretty-boy shots."

Music
Peckinpah's longtime composer and collaborator Jerry Fielding was commissioned to score The Getaway. He had worked previously with the director on Noon Wine (1966), The Wild Bunch (1969), Straw Dogs (1970), and Junior Bonner. After the film's second preview screening, McQueen was unhappy with the music and used his clout to hire Quincy Jones to rescore the film. Jones's music had a jazzier edge and featured harmonica solos by Toots Thielemans and vocals by Don Elliott, both of whom had been his associates. Peckinpah was unhappy with this action and took out a full-page ad in Daily Variety on November 17, 1972, which included a letter he had written to Fielding thanking him for his work. Fielding would work with Peckinpah on two more films, Bring Me the Head of Alfredo Garcia (1974) and The Killer Elite (1975). Jones was nominated for a Golden Globe award for his original score.

Release

Theatrical run and box office
There were two preview screenings for The Getaway: a lackluster one in San Francisco and an enthusiastic one in San Jose, California. In the second week of January 1973, the film grossed an estimated $874,000 in thirty-nine locations in the United States. It also peaked on Varietys box office chart. The film had grossed $18,943,592 by the end of 1973, and went on to become the eighth highest-grossing film of the year. Its North American rentals for that year were $17,500,000. On a production budget of $3,352,254, the film grossed $36,734,619 in the US alone.

Walter Hill later recalled:

Home media
Warner Home Video released a two-disc DVD version of The Getaway on November 19, 1997, presented in widescreen and pan and scan. Warner released the film again on DVD as part of The Essential Steve McQueen Collection seven-disc box set on May 31, 2005, followed by an HD DVD and a Blu-ray version on February 27, 2007. Special features include audio commentary by Peckinpah's biographers and documentarians Nick Redman, Garner Simmons, David Weddle, and Paul Seydor and a 12-minute "virtual" commentary by Peckinpah, McQueen and MacGraw. There is also a featurette entitled Main Title 1M1 Jerry Fielding, Sam Peckinpah & The Getaway which includes interviews with composer Jerry Fielding's wife and two daughters, and Peckinpah's assistant.

Critical reception
Initial reaction to The Getaway was negative. Vincent Canby of The New York Times called the film "aimless". Roger Ebert of the Chicago Sun-Times complained that the story was contrived, calling it "a big, glossy, impersonal mechanical toy", and rated it 2 out of 4 stars. The New Yorkers Pauline Kael said the on-screen relationship between McQueen and MacGraw leaves much to be desired. In hindsight, Kael referred to MacGraw as a much worse actress than Candice Bergen. Jay Cocks of Time magazine felt that Peckinpah "was pushing his privileges too far", but complimented his film as "a work of a competent craftsman". The New York Daily News Kathleen Carroll denounced the film for being "too violent and vulgar". John Simon called The Getaway "a sourly disappointing, ugly, and unbelievable film". Conversely, the Chicago Tribune Gene Siskel said The Getaway "play[ed] like a 1970s Bonnie and Clyde", giving it 3 stars out of 4. Stanley Kauffmann of The New Republic wrote- "McGraw is a zero, so she makes us question her all the time. Outside of that (immense) flaw in casting, the picture is smashing".

Modern criticism has been more appreciative. Dennis Schwartz of Ozus World Movie Reviews gave it a B grade rating, praising most of the film's action sequences and calling it "a gripping thriller (...) filmed in Peckinpah's excessive action-packed violent and amoral style". Newell Todd of CHUD.com scored it 7 out of 10, considering it "an entertaining film that is only made better with some McQueen action". Casey Broadwater of Blu-ray.com described it as "an effective thriller that plays with and against some of [Peckinpah's] well-noted stylistic trademarks, ... a well-constructed, lovers on the run-style heist flick". Writing for Cinema Crazed, Felix Vasquez also lauded most action scenes and remarked: "The Getaway is a top notch crime thriller with a fantastic turn by McQueen and it's still the best action movie I've ever seen."

Rotten Tomatoes gives the film a score of 86% based on 21 reviews from critics, with an average rating of 6.9/10. The website's consensus reads, "The Getaway sees Sam Peckinpah and Steve McQueen, the kings of violence and cool, working at full throttle". Rotten Tomatoes also ranked the film at  47 on its "75 Best Heist Movies of All Time" list. In 2010, The Playlist included The Getaway on its list of the "25 All-Time Favorite Heist Movies", describing it as "a solid, straight-ahead action flick that's always fun to wander into the middle of on late night TV."

Remake

A remake of the film, directed by Roger Donaldson and co-written by Walter Hill, was released on February 11, 1994. It stars Alec Baldwin and Kim Basinger, with Michael Madsen, James Woods, David Morse, and Jennifer Tilly. The film received negative reviews upon its release, with critics calling it a clichéd and uninspired retread of the Peckinpah film. In 2008, Baldwin referred to it as a "bomb".

See also
 Heist film
 List of American films of 1972

Citations

General bibliography

External links

 
 

1972 films
1970s action thriller films
1970s crime thriller films
1970s heist films
Adultery in films
American action thriller films
American chase films
American crime thriller films
American heist films
Films scored by Quincy Jones
Films about bank robbery
Films based on American novels
Films based on crime novels
Films based on Jim Thompson novels
Films directed by Sam Peckinpah
Films set in Houston
Films set in Texas
Films shot in El Paso, Texas
Films shot in New Braunfels, Texas
Films shot in San Antonio
First Artists films
American neo-noir films
Films with screenplays by Walter Hill
1970s English-language films
1970s American films